Contarinia negundinis, known generally as boxelder gall midge, is a species of gall midges in the family Cecidomyiidae. Other common names include the boxelder bud gall midge and boxelder leaf gall midge. It is the only North American species that enters diapause during the pupal stage of development.

References

Further reading

 
 

Cecidomyiinae
Articles created by Qbugbot
Insects described in 1890
Gall-inducing insects